The 2017–18 Northern Colorado Bears men's basketball team represented the University of Northern Colorado during the 2017–18 NCAA Division I men's basketball season. The Bears were led by second-year head coach Jeff Linder and played their home games at Bank of Colorado Arena in Greeley, Colorado as members of the Big Sky Conference. They finished the season 26–12, 11–7 in Big Sky play to finish in fifth place. They defeated Northern Arizona and Weber State to advance to the semifinals of the Big Sky tournament to Montana. They were invited to the CollegeInsider.com Tournament where they defeated Drake, San Diego, Sam Houston State and UIC to become CIT champions.

Previous season
The Bears finished the 2016–17 season 11–18, 7–11 in Big Sky play to finish in a tie for eighth place. On October 8, 2016, the school self-imposed a postseason ban amid an ongoing NCAA investigation.

Departures

2017 incoming recruits

Roster

Schedule and results

|-
!colspan=9 style=|Exhibition

|-
!colspan=9 style=|Non-conference regular season

|-
!colspan=9 style=| Big Sky regular season

|-
! colspan="9" style=| Big Sky tournament

|-
! colspan="9" style=| CIT

References

Northern Colorado Bears men's basketball seasons
Northern Colorado
Northern Colorado Bears men's basketball
Northern Colorado Bears men's basketball
Northern Colorado
CollegeInsider.com Postseason Tournament championship seasons